Ádám Rajhona (12 December 1943 – 20 May 2016) was a Hungarian actor. He appeared in more than 90 films and television shows between 1972 and 2016.

Selected filmography
 Present Indicative (1972)
 The Fortress (1979)
 Sound Eroticism (1986)
 Európa expressz (1999)

References

External links

1943 births
2016 deaths
Hungarian male film actors
People from Târgu Mureș